is a Japanese musician, lyricist, composer, record producer and author who is affiliated with Amuse, Inc. His artist name at his debut was , and he formed a band named No Score with his classmates at high school which later became Porno Graffitti. Originally he was the lead vocalist, but since Akihito Okano joined, he became the lead guitarist and provided backing vocals. He is also a guitarist for THE Yatou. His former wife is actress Kyōko Hasegawa.

Instruments used

Electric guitars
Gibson Guitar Corporation
1960 Les Paul Standard No. 0 0599 (main)
1958 Les Paul Custom "Factory Original Bigsby"
1965 ES-345
Custom Shop Historic Collection 1959 Les Paul Standard '00
Custom Shop Historic Collection 1960 Les Paul Standard
Custom Shop Historic Collection 1959 Les Paul Standard No. 9 1273
Custom Shop Historic Collection 1968 Les Paul Custom Black Beauty #015328
Memphis Chris Cornell ES-335 Flat Black
Custom Shop CS-336 Plain Top
Les Paul Junior Limited Edition (until 2011, he donated to charity)
1996 Les Paul Standard
1981 ES-335TD
ES-165
Flying V
Fender Musical Instruments Corporation
Custom Shop Master Built Series 1957 Telecaster Made by John English '05 (main)
Telecaster Haruichi Model (Replica of the main guitar above. Realized by a collaboration project with a fan club and Fender Japan in 2016)
Custom Shop Master Built Series 1957 Stratocaster Made by John English
Custom Shop Master Built Series Stratocaster Made by Yuriy Shishkov
Custom Shop Master Built Series 60's Telecaster Made by Todd Krause
Custom Shop 1960 Stratocaster Relic #R41857
1959 Custom Esquire
1974 Stratocaster
1975 Telecaster Deluxe
1976 Stratocaster
Others
Paul Reed Smith Modern Eagle Faded Blue Jean
Sago New Material Guitars Signature Model No. 1 Black
Sago New Material Guitars Signature Model No. 2 White
Sago New Material Guitars Signature Model No. 3 Blue Burst
Killer Prime Original Black & Prime Original Yellow
Gretsch 1969 White Falcon
Gretsch Duo Jet 6128 with Bigsby
B.C. Rich Mockingbird Slash Model
G&L Asat Special With Bigsby
Jerry Jones Baby Sitar
G'Seven Guitars g7 Special g7-JM Custom Order Model (Jazzmaster Type)
Washburn N3 Original davies reissue
Line 6 James Tyler Variax JTV-59 Black

Acoustic guitars
Martin HD-28V (main)
Martin Pre War 000-28
Martin 000-28EC (until 2011, he donated to charity)
Gibson Les Paul Acoustic
Gibson Chester Atkins CEC
Gibson J-50
Greco Zematis GZA-1800 Tiny Heart
Ovation 2003 Collector's Edition
Alvarez Yairi WK1-12BK
Kohno Guitar Manufacture Concert-J, etc.

Amplifiers
Groove Tubes Trio
Matchless DC-30
Marshall 1973X
Marshall 1974X
Marshall 1987X
Marshall JCM800
Reinhardt Storm 33
Fender Twin-Reverb
Fender Vibro-King Custom
Fender Bassman
Vox AC30BM (Brian May Custom Limited Edition)

From his early debut to around 2007, the Trio, DC-30, and JCM series were used live. Currently it is mainly the combination of Old Marshall and DC-30. On the other hand, amplifier simulators such as Kemper are used as a sub.

Provided musical lyrics
{|class="wikitable"
|-
! Artist
! Song
! Notes
|-
|rowspan="2"| Color || Rav & Business ||
|-
|Remake || "Tsubasa ga nakute mo" coupling
|-
|rowspan="6"| Buzy || Kujira ||
|-
|Venus Say... || Kujira coupling, Twin Spica opening song
|-
|Hitori ichizu ||
|-
|Be Somewhere ||
|-
|Pasion ||
|-
|Nakitai Yoru ni Kikitaikotoba || Pasion coupling
|-
| Michihiro Kuroda || la la || Album in depth included
|-
|rowspan="2"| Hemenway || Gensō to Dance ||
|-
|Hanbun Ningen ||
|-
| Hiromi Ōta || Kimi ga itta honto no Koto || Album Hajimari wa "ma-gokoro" datta. included
|-
| Naohito Fujiki || Tuning Note || NTV drama Harikei theme song
|-
| Skoop On Somebody || Q || TBS Ai no Gekijō Onsen e Go! theme song
|-
|rowspan="6"| Rein Yoshii || Faded ||
|-
|Just One ||
|-
|Ammonite ||
|-
|Pill Case ||
|-
|Logic ||
|-
|Arashi ||
|-
| Akina Nakamori || Hirari (Sakura)" || "Fixer (While the Women Are Sleeping)" coupling
|-
| Kanjani Eight || Otoseyo || Dorobo Yakusha main theme song
|-
| rowspan="2"| Megumi Nakajima || Submarine || Album Curiosity included
|-
|Suisou || TBS Stars Align opening song
|-
| Reon Yuzuki || Alert feat. NAOTO || Mini Album R ing included
|-
| Team SHACHI || Rocket Queen feat. MCU ||
|-
| rowspan="2"| Maaya Sakamoto || Loop || Tsubasa: Reservoir Chronicle ending song. Under pen name h's
|-
|My Favorite Books || Under pen name h's||
|-
| Mayday|| Buzzin''' || Japanese version of Party Animal|}

Filmography
Radio
 Regular

Television
 Regular

Special occasion

Films

Bibliography
MonographsJitaku nite Sony Magazines – taking a column serialised in the music magazine Pati Pati (released 24 December 2005 )

Serialisations
"Jitaku nite" – serialised in the music magazine Pati Pati (February 2001 issue – April 2005 issue, 51 times in total)
"haru.cam" – posted pictures and comments for himself at the music magazine B.Pass (May 2006 issue – already finished)
"Hiroshima Carp Fan mo Umi o Wataru" – he was writing a column about baseball at the Major League information magazine Slugger (May 2006 issue – serialising)
"Otoko no Kōkan Nikki" – posted alternately with Akihito at the female fashion magazine "an an" (20 June 2006 – June 2007)
"Tokinoo" – Novel. Serialized in the magazine papyrus (February 2008 issue – April 2009)

Novels
 Toki no O Gentosha – book of the novel "Tokinoo" (released 15 May 2010 )
 The Rules'' (released September 2017 )

References

External links 

  

Living people
1974 births
Musicians from Hiroshima Prefecture
Japanese rock guitarists
Japanese lyricists
Japanese male composers
Amuse Inc. talents
21st-century Japanese singers
21st-century guitarists
21st-century Japanese male singers